The 33rd Armoured Division, based at Hisar Military Station, is part of I Corps "Strike Corps" of Indian Army. I Corps is a battle formation under South Western Command headquartered at Jaipur.

Indian armoured regiment, the 1 Horse (Skinner's Horse) raised by James Skinner at Hansi in 1803 is based at Hissar.

History

Formation

33rd Armoured Division was raised on 15 November 1982 by Major General L. B. Sondhi. It was converted into an Armoured Division in December 1993.

Arjun Tank Trial
Phase II of Arjun Tank was conducted at Hisar, Haryana and check was made for medium fording capability.

Component units

Command: South Western Command (Jaipur)

The 33rd Armoured Division is part of I Corps under South Western Command of Indian Army.

 I Corps, headquartered at Mathura, Uttar Pradesh, consists of the following 3 army divisions:
the 4th Infantry Division (Allahabad, Uttar Pradesh) also called Red Eagle
the 23rd Infantry Division(Ranchi, Jharkhand) also called Cockerel
the 33rd Armoured Division (Hisar Military Station, Haryana)
 the X Corps headquartered at Bathinda, Punjab consists of
the 16th Infantry Division (Sudarshan) (Ganganagar, Rajasthan)
the 18th RAPID (Kota, Rajasthan)
the 24th RAPID (Bikaner, Rajasthan).
the 6th Independent Armoured Brigade, SAND VIPER BRIGADE (Suratgarh, Rajasthan).

Corps: I Corps (Mathura)

The I Corps strike corps of the South Western Command, created in 1965 and headquartered at Mathura, consists of the following 3 army divisions:
the 4th Infantry Division (Allahabad), Uttar Pradesh), also called "Red Eagle"
the 23rd Infantry Division (Ranchi), Jharkhand, also called "Cockerel"
the 33rd Armoured Division (Hisar Military Station, Haryana)

Division: 33rd Armoured Division, (Hisar)

The 33rd Armoured Division has 5 Brigades (3 Armoured, 1 Artillery & 1 Air Defence brigades).

Brigade: 5 Brigades of the 33rd Armoured Division

A Regiment is a homogenous unit specializing in one thing e.g. Armoured (tank), Mechanised (vehicles), Artillery, etc. A Brigade is multi-functional unit composed of different types of Battalions from various Regiments.

The '33rd Armoured Division' has total 5 Brigades:
 the 39th Armoured Brigade (formerly '39th Mechanised Brigade')
 the 57th Armoured Brigade (formerly '57th Mechanised Brigade')
 the 88th Armoured Brigade (formerly '88th Mechanised Brigade')
 the 627th (Independent) Armoured Air Defence Brigade (formerly '627th (Independent) Mechanised Air Defence Brigade')
 the 33rd Artillery Brigade

It initially consisted of the 88 Mechanised Brigade (was already in existence), the 39 Mechanised Brigade and the 33 Artillery Brigade were also raised on 15 November 1982. The 57 Mechanised Brigade was raised on 1 March 1983. The 627th (Independent) Mechanised Air Defence Brigade became part of the Division's Orbat (Order of battle) on 1 December 1989. Later, all Mechanised Brigades were converted to the Armoured Brigades.

Battalion: each Armoured Brigade of 3rd Armoured Division has two Mechanised Battalions

Each of three Armoured Brigades (39, 57 & 88 Armoured Brigades) in the 33rd Armoured Division comprise
Two Armoured Regiments ((includes T-72 Tanks and potentially T-90 and/or Arjun Tank in future)). This includes the historical 1 Horse Armoured Regiment (Skinner's Horse) raised by James Skinner at Hansi in 1803.
2 Mechanised Battalions (amphibious vehicles e.g. BMP-2).
 the 33rd Artillery Brigade comprises three regiments:
1 x Towed artillery Regiment (e.g. Howitzer),
1 x Self propelled artillery Regiment
1 x LT AD (Light Air Defence) artillery and was located at Faridkot & Ferozpur. See details of Artillery of India.

Notable Soldiers
 late Maj. Gen. L.B.S. Sondhi - founder of 33rd Armoured Division

See also
 Mechanized Infantry Regiment
 Order of battle

References

Orbat.com, Indian Armoured Divisions - vignette, archive

Military units and formations established in 1982
Divisions of the Indian Army
Cantonments of India
Hisar (city)
1982 establishments in India